The flag of Palestine is a tricolor of three equal horizontal stripes (black, white, and green from top to bottom) overlaid by a red triangle issuing from the hoist. This flag is derived from the Pan-Arab colors and is used to represent the State of Palestine and the Palestinian people. It was first adopted on 28 May 1964 by the Palestinian Liberation Organization. The flag day is celebrated on 30 September.

The flag is almost identical to that of the extinct Hashemite Kingdom of Hejaz and to that of Syria's Ba'ath Party (both use a 2:3 ratio as opposed to Palestine's 1:2), as well as the short-lived Arab Federation of Iraq and Jordan (which had an equilateral triangle at the hoist). It is also very similar to the Flag of Jordan and to the Flag of Western Sahara, all of which draw their inspiration from the Arab Revolt against Ottoman rule (1916–1918). The flag of the Arab Revolt had the same graphic form, but the colours were arranged differently (white on the bottom, rather than in the middle).

In 2021, President Mahmoud Abbas approved the annual lowering of the flag to lament the Balfour Declaration.

Origin

The flag used by the Arab Palestinian nationalists in the first half of the 20th century is the flag of the 1916 Arab Revolt. The origins of the flag are the subject of dispute and mythology. In one version, the colours were chosen by the Arab nationalist 'Literary Club' in Istanbul in 1909, based on the words of the 13th-century Arab poet Safi al-Din al-Hili:

Ask the high rising spears, of our aspirations
Bring witness the swords, did we lose hope
We are a band, honor halts our souls
Of beginning with harm, those who won't harm us
White are our deeds, black are our battles,
Green are our fields, red are our swords.

Another version credits the Young Arab Society, which was formed in Paris in 1911. Yet another version is that the flag was designed by Sir Mark Sykes of the British Foreign Office. Whatever the correct story, the flag was used by Sharif Hussein by 1917 at the latest and quickly became regarded as the flag of the Arab national movement in the Mashriq.

On 18 October 1948, the flag of the Arab Revolt was adopted by the All-Palestine Government, and was recognised subsequently by the Arab League as the flag of Palestine. A modified version (changing the order of stripes) has been used in Palestine at least since the late 1930s and was officially adopted as the flag of the Palestinian people by the Palestine Liberation Organization (PLO) in 1964. On 1 December of the same year, the Executive Committee of the Liberation Organization established a special system for the flag specifying its standards and dimensions, and the black and green colors replaced each other. On 15 November 1988, the PLO adopted the flag as the flag of the State of Palestine.

On the ground the flag became widely used since the Oslo Agreements, with the establishment of the Palestinian Authority in 1993. Today the flag is flown widely by Palestinians and their supporters.

Bans in Israel
In 1967, immediately following the Six-Day War, the State of Israel banned the Palestinian flag in the occupied Gaza Strip and West Bank. A 1980 law forbidding artwork of "political significance" banned artwork composed of its four colours, and Palestinians were arrested for displaying such artwork.

The ban was lifted after the signing of the Oslo Peace Accords in 1993. However, Palestinian flags are nonetheless routinely confiscated by the Israeli police, and in January 2023, Minister of National Security Itamar Ben-Gvir announced the intention of the Israeli Government to outlaw the flag's showcasing in public spaces.

Historical flags

Construction Sheet

Color scheme

See also
 Coat of arms of Palestine
 Flag of the Arab Federation of 1958
 Flag of the Arab Revolt
 Flag of the Baʽath Party
 List of Palestinian flags
 Pan-Arab colors

Notes

External links

 
 The Meaning of the Flag at the website of the Palestinian Academic Society for the Study of International Affairs

Arab nationalist symbols
Palestine
National symbols of the State of Palestine
Palestine
Flag controversies
Censorship in Israel